The New Woody Woodpecker Show (titled on-screen as The Woody Woodpecker Show) is an American animated comedy television series based on the animated short film series created by cartoonist and animator Walter Lantz. It was developed by animator Bob Jaques, and co-developed by and storyboard artist Kelly Armstrong. It was produced by Universal Cartoon Studios and aired from May 8, 1999 to July 27, 2002 on Fox's Fox Kids programming block.

It is an updated version of The Woody Woodpecker Show with characters from the original series and a few new ones appearing in their own segments, in a manner similar to the original Looney Tunes shorts from Warner Bros. Each episode consists of two segments featuring Woody Woodpecker sandwiching one starring Chilly Willy, with Winnie Woodpecker and Knothead & Splinter also starring in some segments. 53 episodes (157 segments) were produced.

Characters

Woody Woodpecker / Winnie Woodpecker / Knothead and Splinter
Woody Woodpecker (Billy West) - A mischievous pileated woodpecker who lives in a tree-house overlooking his landlady's house in the suburbs of the Southland. His personality mirrors Tom Sawyer, a lazy and crazy moocher or even a freeloader, often looking for ways to get by without lifting a finger. This does not endear him to his rivals, but Woody doesn't take their resistance lightly. His father is Scottish, and Woody is proud of his Scottish heritage: even though he uses English golf balls and oftentimes shows English traits, or rather British traits.
Winnie Woodpecker (B. J. Ward) - A female pileated woodpecker and Woody's best friend/girlfriend who tends to get into her own misadventures. She has a more dignified persona than Woody's.
Knothead (Elizabeth Daily) and Splinter (Nika Futterman) - Woody and Winnie's nephew and niece, respectively, a pair of young pileated woodpeckers who can't help but give to their uncle (and anybody else) a hard time.
Buzz Buzzard (Mark Hamill) - A sleazy common buzzard who is the main antagonist of the series. He always concocts scams and cons on Woody, Winnie or Knothead and Splinter, though the woodpeckers frequently outsmart him. 
Tweakey Da Lackey (Mark Hamill) - A domestic canary who is usually Buzz's henchman, often reluctant about it.
Wally Walrus (Billy West) - A Swedish walrus who is Woody's neighbor and long-time foil but is not as antagonistic as either Buzz or other characters with Woody being always greedy and looking for mischief to ensue. Despite his rivalry with Woody, there are times where the duo team up and work together.
Ms. Meany (Andrea Martin) - Woody's ugly old landlady who rents the tree-house Woody lives in and Wally's neighbor. Being more violent than other characters, she is generally  more antagonistic and mean-spirited than both Buzz and Wally. Often portrayed as a hard worker who takes her job seriously and respects those in authority.
Dapper Denver Dooley (Jim Cummings) - An obnoxious manchild who always tries to steal things from Woody.

Chilly Willy
Chilly Willy - A voiceless penguin who lives in Antarctica, his misadventures result from his constant endeavors to fill his empty stomach and/or find relief from the cold. Despite his innocent demeanor, Chilly is quite the troublemaker.
Smedley (Billy West) - A hound dog that is frequently at odds with Chilly, though usually portrayed as more an authority figure than an antagonist. He is very easygoing and generally does not break his calm demeanor, but Chilly always pushes Smedley's patience to the breaking point.
Chilly Lilly - A female penguin who is Chilly Willy's girlfriend and appears in the episode Chilly Lilly.
Maxie the Polar Bear (Billy West) - An intelligent polar bear who is one of Chilly's friends. He makes a few appearances on Chilly's segments.
Sgt. Hogwash (Blake Clark) - A pig military officer who operates in a government base in the Antarctic, and is plagued by Chilly's mischievousness.
Major Bull (Kevin Michael Richardson) - A bull who is Hogwash's superior.

Additional characters
Dr. Doug Nutts (Billy West) - A physician who is impersonating Don Knotts. He appears in the episode "Woody and the Termite" until "Painfaker".
Mother Nature (B. J. Ward) - A fairy who usually gets onto Woody for being too lazy to fulfill his role in nature. She appears in the episodes "Woody and the Termite", "Downsized Woody", "Whistle Stop Woody" and "Teacher's Pet". In "Teacher's Pet", her appearance is different from that in the three prior episodes. She retains her original pre-design in Crazy Castle 5.
Creepy Badger (Mark Hamill) - A creepy and psychotic badger. While is not generally a real villain, he has worked alongside Wally Walrus as assistant and played the role as the main antagonist in one episode. He speaks in a gravelly, deep, and generally creepy voice. He also really loves tobogganing. His catchphrase is "Hi-ya, buddy!".
Nicky Knickknacker (Tim Curry) - A high society pileated woodpecker thief who appears in the episode "Eenie, Meany, Out You Go".
Billy (Jim Cummings) and Louie (Rob Paulsen) - A pair of troublemaker dogs that had the tendency to annoy Knothead and Splinter, Billy is the leader and agrresive of the duet, meanhile Louie is a little dumb.
Woody's Father (Corey Burton) - A pileated woodpecker who is the father of Woody.
Caveman Woodpecker (Billy West) - A caveman who is a woodpecker.
Judge (Billy West) - A judge who appears in the episode "Painfaker" until "Couples Therapy". In "Stage Fright", he condemns Buzz and Tweakey.
Willy Walrus (Rob Paulsen) - Wally's nephew who appears in the episodes "Just Say Uncle" and "Stuck on You".
Cupid (Billy West) - A cupid who appears in the episode "Date with Destiny".
Woodrow Woodpecker (Carlos Alazraqui) - A nerdy woodpecker who appears in "Teacher's Pet".

Additional voices
 Jess Harnell as Businessman (in "Wiener Wars"), Joe (in "Wiener Wars"), Pirate (in "Woody's Ship of Ghouls")
 Peter Jason
 Brogan Roche
 Pamela Adlon as Lester the Termite (in "Woody and the Termite")
 Julie Brown as Customer (in "Bad Hair Day"), Judge (in "Winnie's New Car")
 Corey Burton as Woody Woodpecker's Father, TV Announcer (in "Mexican Chilly")
 Joe Lala as Cable Mole (in "Cable Ace")
 Ellen Idelson
 Eugene Roche
 Jeff Bennett as Pigeon Boss (in "Downsizing Woody"), Gabby Gator (in "Corn Fed Up")
 Jim Cummings as Captain Redwood (in "Woody's Ship of Ghouls"), Oakey (in "Woody's Ship of Ghouls"), Chef Rufus le Doufus ("Cajun Chilly"), Dr. Von Brain (in "Couple's Therapy"), Carl Castaway (in "Surviving Woody")
 Diane A. Crea
 Rob Paulsen as Corky (in "Woody's Ship of Ghouls"), Woody Clone (in "Two Woodys, No Waiting"), Gunther (in "Bavariannoying"), (in "Be a Sport")
 Dan Castellaneta as Chester the Cockroach (in "Brother Cockroach")
 Pat Fraley as Kid (in "Mexican Chilly"), Nash (in "Automatic Woody")
 Tress MacNeille as Helga (in "The Chilly Show"), Hens (in "Chicken Woody")
 Charles Martin Smith as Marty (in "The Chilly Show")
 Kevin Michael Richardson as The Granulador (in "The Contender")

Episodes

Series overview

The segments indicate in colors by which characters starred in them:
 Blue = Woody Woodpecker (105 segments)
 Red = Chilly Willy (31 segments)
 Pink = Winnie Woodpecker (11 segments)
 Sky Blue = Knothead & Splinter (10 segments)

Season 1 (1999)

Season 2 (2000)
From episode 27 to the end of the series, all episodes were directed by Alan Zaslove.

Season 3 (2002)

Broadcast
The New Woody Woodpecker Show aired on Fox Kids from May 8, 1999, through July 27, 2002. The show also aired on YTV and coming soon on WildBrainTV in Canada and CBBC in the UK.

Home media
Few DVDs were released in the UK, previously on VHS. As of February 2018, the first 13 episodes can be viewed on Hulu and Yahoo! View. Previously, all 53 episodes were available for streaming on Netflix. The full series is now part of the NBCUniversal streaming service Peacock, ever since its launch on July 15, 2020.

Successor

References

External links
 
 
 The New Woody Woodpecker Show at Keyframe – the Animation Resource

1999 American television series debuts
2002 American television series endings
1990s American animated television series
2000s American animated television series
1990s American anthology television series
2000s American anthology television series
American children's animated anthology television series
American children's animated comedy television series
Fox Kids
Television series created by Bob Jaques
Fox Broadcasting Company original programming
Television series by Universal Television
Television series by Universal Animation Studios
Animated television series reboots
Woody Woodpecker
Animated television series about birds
Animated television series about penguins
Animated television shows based on films